Below are the squads for the 2009 UEFA U-17 Championship tournament in Germany. Players whose names are marked in bold went on to earn full international caps.

Players' ages as of the tournament's opening day (6 May 2009).

Group A

Head coach: Ginés Meléndez

Head coach: Philippe Bergeroo

Head coach: Pasquale Salerno

Head coach: Dany Ryser

Group B

Head coach: John Peacock

Head coach: Marco Pezzaiuoli

Head coach: Albert Stuivenberg

Head coach: Abdullah Ercan

References

UEFA European Under-17 Championship squads
squads